Jean-Albert Dinkespiler (1927-2014) was a French engineer and former Chief of the European Joint Research Centre.

Early life
He was born in Paris. He studied Marine and Aeronautical Engineering.

Career

Space research
He joined the Centre national d'études spatiales (CNES, the French space agency) in 1962, which had been recently formed in December 1961.

Between 1967 and 1974 he was Director of Programmes and Planning at the European Space Research Organisation (ESRO) in Paris, which was merged in 1975 to form the European Space Agency (ESA). In early 1975, the Programmes and Planning department was split into a department for the Communication Satellite Programme (for MAROTS, the maritime navigation satellite, and Orbital Test Satellite, OTS), and a department for Science and Meteosat. Meteosat-1 had been first launched in November 1977, and was controlled by EUMETSAT from 1983 in Darmstadt, Germany. The ground link was to the Fucino Space Centre in Italy, currently run by Telespazio. Darmstadt's European Space Operations Centre (ESOC) had been established by ESRO in September 1967, and currently runs ESA's space missions - its mission control centre.

Joint Research Centre
He became Director-General of the EEC's Joint Research Centre on 1 April 1982. He was deputy Director between 1974 and 1979. When appointed in 1982, the centre received about £95 million in funding each year.

The Directorate-General is based in Brussels. The current Director-General is Vladimír Šucha.

Personal life
He died in 2014.

See also
 Directorate-General for Research and Innovation (European Commission)

References

1927 births
2014 deaths
Engineers from Paris
European Economic Community officials
French aerospace engineers
Space program of France